Blastobasis deliciolarum is a moth in the  family Blastobasidae. It is found in Costa Rica.

The length of the forewings is 4–6.7 mm. The forewings have brownish-grey scales tipped with pale brownish grey intermixed with brown and pale brownish-grey scales. The hindwings are pale brown, gradually darkening towards the apex.

Etymology
The specific name is derived from Latin deliciolae (meaning darling).

References

Moths described in 2013
Blastobasis